The 2000 WNBA Playoffs was the postseason for the Women's National Basketball Association's 2000 season which ended with the  Western Conference champion Houston Comets beating the Eastern Conference champion New York Liberty, 2-0. Cynthia Cooper was named the MVP of the Finals.

Format
The top 4 teams from each conference qualify for the playoffs.
All 4 teams are seeded by basis of their standings.

Road to the playoffs
Eastern Conference

Western Conference

Note:Teams with an "X" clinched playoff spots.

Playoffs

First round

Cleveland Rockers vs. Orlando Miracle

New York Liberty vs. Washington Mystics

Los Angeles Sparks vs. Phoenix Mercury

Houston Comets vs. Sacramento Monarchs

Conference finals

New York Liberty vs. Cleveland Rockers

Los Angeles Sparks vs. Houston Comets

WNBA Championship

See also
List of WNBA Champions

References

External links
Link to WNBA Playoffs series, recap, and boxscores

Playoffs
Women's National Basketball Association Playoffs